Steven R. Jensen (born March 18, 1963) is the chief justice of the South Dakota Supreme Court since 2021. He was appointed as an associate justice by Governor Dennis Daugaard in 2017.  He became the 50th member of the court, succeeding Justice Lori S. Wilbur.

Early life and education
Jensen attended Bethel College in St. Paul, Minnesota, and graduated from there in 1985. During the summer of 1984, he worked as an intern for U.S. Senator Chuck Grassley. His Juris Doctor degree was conferred by the University of South Dakota in 1988.

Legal career
Jensen served as  a judicial law clerk for Associate Justice Richard W. Sabers of the South Dakota Supreme Court.  In 1989, he started working at the Crary Huff Law Firm in Sioux City, Iowa. He was an attorney at Crary Huff until 2003.  At that time he was appointed to the First Judicial Circuit Court of South Dakota, serving until 2014.  He was Presiding Judge of that circuit from 2011 to 2014. In June 2020, it was announced that Jensen was selected to replace David Gilbertson as the next Chief Justice of the South Dakota Supreme Court. He assumed office in January 2021.

Professional affiliations including his service as chairman of the Unified Judicial System’s Presiding Judges Council and  president of the South Dakota Judges Association.

Personal life
Jensen married Sue Nelson in 1990. They have one daughter, Rachel; two sons, Ryan and Andrew; and one son-in-law, Blake Roberts.

References 

|-

1963 births
21st-century American judges
Bethel University (Minnesota) alumni
Chief Justices of the South Dakota Supreme Court
Justices of the South Dakota Supreme Court
Living people
People from Viborg, South Dakota
University of South Dakota School of Law alumni